Poonamben Veljibhai Jat (born 9 April 1971) is an Indian Politician belonging to the Bharatiya Janata Party. She was elected to the Lok Sabha, lower house of the Parliament of India from the Kachchh constituency in 2009.

References

External links
Official biographical sketch in Parliament of India website
Poonamben Personal Website

Gujarati people
Living people
1971 births
India MPs 2009–2014
Women in Gujarat politics
Lok Sabha members from Gujarat
People from Gandhidham
21st-century Indian women politicians
21st-century Indian politicians
Bharatiya Janata Party politicians from Gujarat
Politicians from Kutch district